Alkin is a surname. Notable people with the surname include:

Elizabeth Alkin (1600–1655), English publisher, nurse, and spy
John Alkin (born 1947), English actor
Lee Everett Alkin (born 1937), English psychic
Marvin C. Alkin (born 1934), American academic

See also
 Alkan (disambiguation)
 Alken (disambiguation)
 Alkon (disambiguation)